Koloonella moniliformis, common name the necklace pyramid-shell,  is a species of sea snail, a marine gastropod mollusk in the family Murchisonellidae, the pyrams and their allies.

Distribution
This marine species occurs off Eastern Australia, New South Wales, Victoria, Australia, and Tasmania.

References

 May, W.L. (1923). An Illustrated Index of Tasmanian Shells. Hobart : Government Printer. 100 pp.
 Allan, J. (1950). Australian Shells: with related animals living in the sea, in freshwater and on the land. Melbourne : Georgian House. xix 470 pp.
 Iredale, T. & McMichael, D.F. (1962). A reference list of the marine Mollusca of New South Wales. Memoirs of the Australian Museum. 11 : 1-109
 Macpherson, J.H. & Gabriel, C.J. (1962). Marine Mollusca of Victoria. Melbourne : Melbourne Univ. Press. 475 pp.

External links
 To World Register of Marine Species
  Simon Grove: A guide to the seashells and other marine moilluscs of Tasmania : Koloonella moniliformis

Murchisonellidae
Gastropods described in 1891